Nataly Kelly (born 1975 in Mason City, Illinois, United States) is an American technology executive, marketer, translator. and writer with experience in the field of language and localization. Kelly has worked with companies such as AT&T, Language Line Solutions, and HubSpot.

Education and career 

Kelly holds a Bachelor's degree in Spanish from Wartburg College and received a Fulbright grant to study sociolinguistics in Ecuador.

Kelly has a career in the language services and technology industries, starting in the mid 1990s. She has worked with different companies in roles related to localization and international expansion.  

In 2007, she served as Chief Research Officer of Common Sense Advisory, a research and consulting firm that focuses on globalization, international business and language services.

Kelly is a speaker in the language services industry and has spoken at events such as the American Translators Association Conference, the LocJAM Conference, and the Localization World Conference.

Work 
Kelly is an author who has written several books on language and translation. These include:

 Take Your Company Global: "The New Rules of International Expansion", 2023.
 Found in Translation: "How Language Shapes Our Lives and Transforms the World", with Jost Zetzsche, 2012.
 Telephone Interpreting: "A Comprehensive Guide to the Profession", 2008.

Awards and recognition 
Kelly has received several awards and honors for her contributions to the fields of technology, language and localization.   

 In 2012, Kelly was recognized as one of the "Top Women in Technology" by the Massachusetts Technology Leadership Council.
 In 2019, Kelly was honored as a "Woman Worth Watching" by Profiles in Diversity Journal for her contributions to the language services industry and her efforts in promoting diversity and inclusion in the workplace.
 In 2020, she was named as one of the most influential women in the language industry by Common Sense Advisory.
 In addition to her professional accomplishments, Kelly is a state certified court interpreter (National Center for State Courts) and has served as a member of the American Translators Association and the National Association of Judiciary Interpreters and Translators (NAJIT).
 Her work has been featured in various publications such as the New York Times, Forbes, and Fast Company.

Personal life 
Nataly Kelly is a US citizen. Nataly Kelly is a multilingual speaker who is bilingual in English and Spanish, and is proficient in a variety of other languages.

References

External link 

 Nataly Kelly on Amazon

1975 births
Living people